Theatrix Interactive, Inc. is a now defunct software company that produced such computer games as Hollywood, Hollywood High, Bumptz Science Carnival, Snootz Math Trek, and the Juilliard Music Adventure. The company was founded in 1982 by Joyce Hakansson with the ambition to create educational software.

Originally called Berkeley Learning Technologies, Hakansson's company created more than 50 children's products for other software publishers including Edmark, Broderbund, and Davidson. Award-winning titles include "Millie's Math House" and "Bailey¹s Book House," published by Edmark, and "The Cruncher," published by Davidson. In addition to software programs, the company designed and produced titles for electronic learning toy companies including Sega, Texas Instruments, Tiger Electronics, and many others.

In May, 1995, the company announced its move into the publishing arena under a new name: Theatrix Interactive, Inc.

On August 12, 1997, Sanctuary Woods acquires 100% of the outstanding shares of Theatrix.

References

Defunct video game companies of the United States
Video game development companies